Ericaceous fertilizer is a type of fertilizer that is high in acidity.  It is used on plants from the plant family Ericaceae (Azaleas and Blueberries for example) which thrive in an acidic soil.

References

Fertilizers